The John Kilpatrick Turnpike is a toll road in Oklahoma City, Oklahoma. The turnpike forms a partial loop that runs from State Highway 152 (SH-152) in the west to an interchange with Interstate 35 (I-35) and I-44 in the east. At the eastern terminus, traffic continuing east merges with I-44 traffic, forming the Turner Turnpike.

Route description
The Kilpatrick Turnpike's entire route lies within the city limits of Oklahoma City. There are no exit numbers assigned to any of the turnpike's interchanges.

The Kilpatrick Turnpike begins at an interchange with SH-152 just west of Council Road in southwestern Oklahoma City. The turnpike heads generally north and west from this interchange, with exits to Morgan Road, Sara Road/SW 29th Street, and a partial interchange with SW 15th street, with traffic exiting from southbound and entering northbound. From there, it angles northeast to a full interchange with I-40/US-270. Another partial interchange is located at N.W. 10th Street, with ramps allowing drivers to join the northbound turnpike and exit the southbound turnpike. The turnpike continues north, passing just east of the Yukon city limits, before making an S-curve to the east, running west of Lake Overholser. The turnpike's first full interchange is with State Highway 66 (SH-66), which runs along N.W. 39th Expressway. North of this interchange, the Kilpatrick Turnpike crosses the North Canadian River. The next interchange is with Wilshire Boulevard. Immediately north of Wilshire Boulevard is the first barrier toll plaza. The highway's next interchange is with SH-3, also known as the Northwest Expressway. The turnpike curves to the east north of here, entering Oklahoma County.

East of the county line, the Kilpatrick Turnpike follows the route of Memorial Road; Memorial splits into a pair of one-way frontage roads during this stretch. The next interchange, at Council Road, allows eastbound traffic to exit and westbound to enter the turnpike. The two interchanges to the east of here, at Rockwell Avenue and MacArthur Road, allow full access. At Meridian Avenue, traffic can exit the turnpike westbound and enter it eastbound. To the east lies an interchange with SH-74, a freeway known as the Lake Hefner Parkway. The interchange only allows direct access from the westbound Kilpatrick Turnpike to southbound SH-74 and from northbound SH-74 to the eastbound turnpike; all other movements must be completed via Memorial Road. The turnpike continues east, with full interchanges at May and Pennsylvania (Penn) avenues. East of Penn, the highway curves southeast, leaving the Memorial Road corridor. The next interchange is at Western Avenue. To the east of here is the second barrier toll plaza. After the toll plaza is the interchange with US-77, a freeway also known as the Broadway Extension. The turnpike then has an interchange at Eastern Avenue. The turnpike then comes to an end at I-35/I-44. Eastbound I-44 splits away from northbound I-35 at this interchange to form the Turner Turnpike, and the eastbound Kilpatrick Turnpike mainline merges into the Turner Turnpike toward Tulsa.

Law enforcement along the John Kilpatrick Turnpike is provided by Oklahoma Highway Patrol Troop YE, a special troop assigned to the turnpike.

History
In 1987, the Oklahoma Legislature authorized construction of the first phase of the turnpike, between I-35 and Lake Hefner Parkway. It was completed in 1991. In 2001, an extension of the turnpike to I-40 was completed.

On October 29, 2015, Governor Mary Fallin announced that the Kilpatrick Turnpike would be extended south to end at SH-152 near Will Rogers World Airport as part of Driving Forward, a $892 million turnpike package. The project began on January 20, 2018. The westbound direction of the extension was opened January 9, 2020. The eastbound direction was opened on the following dates: January 28 from I-40 to Morgan Road, February 4 from Morgan to SH-152 westbound, and February 14 to SH-152 eastbound.

In February 2021, the OTA announced that all of the turnpikes will be going all-electronic tolling within the next five years, starting with the Kilpatrick Turnpike. This change (known as PlatePay) began on the Kilpatrick in July 2021.

Future
On August 2, 2021, the Oklahoma Transportation Commission approved the designation of the John Kilpatrick Turnpike as part of an extension of Interstate 240, forming a beltway around Oklahoma City. ODOT Director Tim Gatz stated in the Transportation Commission meeting that the numbering change was primarily to aid in navigation using digital mapping and routing applications. Gatz also said, "If you look at the Interstate 240 designation on the loop around the Oklahoma City metropolitan area, we are finally to the point where we have a truly contiguous route there that can shoulder the burden of some of that transportation need in a loop format. That's common practice across the country, and you'll see that in many of the metropolitan areas, and that update will really be beneficial as far as everything from signage to how do you describe that route on a green-and-white sign." The designation must be approved by the American Association of State Highway and Transportation Officials (AASHTO) and the Federal Highway Administration (FHWA) to take effect.

Tolls
, it costs $6.65 with PlatePay ($3.20 with Pikepass) to drive the entire length of the turnpike.

Exit list

See also
 Oklahoma Turnpike Authority
 Pikepass

References

External links
 Toll Fares/Chart

Toll roads in Oklahoma
Transportation in Oklahoma City
Transport infrastructure completed in 1991
1991 establishments in Oklahoma
Transportation in Canadian County, Oklahoma
Transportation in Oklahoma County, Oklahoma